is a mountain located near the town of Higashikawa, Hokkaido and the tallest mountain on the Japanese island of Hokkaido. It is part of the Daisetsuzan Volcanic Group of the Ishikari Mountains, it is located in the northern part of the Daisetsuzan National Park.

Its native Ainu name is Kamui-mintara, which means "the playground of the gods".

The mountain is popular with hikers in the summer and can be easily reached from Asahidake Onsen via Asahidake Ropeway. During winter, the mountain is open for use by skiers and snowboarders.

Sugatami Pond, directly below the peak, is famous for its reflection of the peaks, snow, and steam escaping from the volcanic vents.

History
Sulphur was once mined in the fumarolic areas.

Geology
The Japan Meteorological Agency gave the region rank C in volcanic activity. The volcano consists mainly of andesite and  dacite, Holocene volcanic non-alkali mafic rock less than 18,000 years old. In addition to the main peak, there is a smaller volcano emerging from the southeast shoulder of the mountain, .

Eruptive history
Whilst there is no historical record of the eruptions of Mount Asahi, tephrochronology and radiocarbon dating have determined the following events:
 3200 BC ± 75 years, Asahi Soria deposit, corrected radiocarbon dating, explosive eruption
 2800 BC ± 100 years, As-A tephra, corrected radiocarbon dating, explosive eruption and phreatic explosions
 1450 BC ± 50 years, As-B tephra, uncorrected radiocarbon dating, explosive eruption and phreatic explosions
 500 BC ± 50 years, Ash-b tephra, tephrochonology, explosive eruption and phreatic explosions and debris avalanches 
 1739, tephrochronology, explosive eruption and phreatic explosions with possible eruption of the central vent and radial good

Mount Asahi currently exhibits steam activity in the form of fumaroles.

See also
 List of volcanoes in Japan
 List of mountains in Japan

References 

 
 Watanabe, Teiji and Hauser, Markus. ASAHI-DAKE: The heart of the Daisetsuzan National Park. Hiking map 1:25,000. Alice Inc. (2017)

External links

  Ropeway website
  Official tourism information website

Stratovolcanoes of Japan
Volcanoes of Hokkaido
Mountains of Hokkaido
Highest points of Japanese national parks